The Monash Sessions - initiated by the coordinator of jazz and improvisation Associate Professor Robert Burke -  is a series of live albums featuring Kate Ceberano, Vince Jones, Hermeto Pascoal, and the Monash School of Music staff and students. Kate's album was recorded live on 11 September 2015 in the Music Auditorium of Monash University.The Sydney Morning Herald|last=Dwyer|first=Michael|date=7 September 2015 |accessdate=11 October 2016}}</ref> The album was released on 7 October 2016. The album features cover versions of songs by Stevie Wonder, Grace Jones and Massive Attack, as well as Ceberano's own original recordings.

The album was launched with a concert at Monash University on 29 September 2016. The concert was organised by The Sir Zelman Cowen School of Music at Monash University and is Australia's leading international School of Music.

Track listing
 "Jones the Rhythm" / "Wild is the Wind" (featuring Chris Street) – 7:59
 "Other Side of Town" (featuring Kim Kelaart & Aaron Syrian) – 5:28
 "Fisherman's Daughter" (featuring Aidan Hodge) – 5:33
 "Teardrop" (featuring Chris Street) – 5:12
 "A Song of Old" – 3:34
 "Adiós" (featuring Niran Dasika & Robert Burke) – 5:50
 "On Love" (featuring Joshua Kreisler) – 4:00
 "If It's Magic" (featuring Robert Burke) – 5:13
 "Stars & Satellites" (featuring Arin Grigg) – 5:04

Release history

References

Kate Ceberano albums
2016 live albums
Live albums by Australian artists